Robert Eugene Robertson (born October 2, 1946) is an American former professional baseball player. He also played for the Seattle Mariners (1978) and the Toronto Blue Jays (1979). He missed the entire 1968 season due to a kidney obstruction.

Career
Robertson was touted as "another Ralph Kiner" after leading the minor leagues in home runs three times. He had brief trials with the Pittsburgh Pirates in 1967 and 1969, having missed all of the 1968 season due to a kidney obstruction.   

On August 1 of that year, at Atlanta–Fulton County Stadium, Robertson and Stargell each collected five hits in a 20-10 victory over the Atlanta Braves. Not until Andrew McCutchen and Garrett Jones in  did Pirate teammates again collect five hits in the same game. That season, Robertson batted .287 with 27 home runs and 82 runs batted in (all career highs) on a team that won the National League East Division, the Pirates' first trip to the post-season since winning the 1960 World Series. However, they were defeated in the National League Championship Series by the Cincinnati Reds.

In  Robertson hit .271 with 26 home runs and 72 runs batted in. That year, the Pirates defeated the San Francisco Giants in the National League Championship Series, and the Baltimore Orioles 4 games to 3 to win the World Series. In the NLCS, Robertson hit four home runs (a record later tied by Steve Garvey in 1978 and Jeffrey Leonard in 1987), three of them in the Pirates’ Game Two victory, which was played the day after Robertson's 25th birthday. He also added a double, setting the record for most total bases in a post-season game, as well as tying the record of 4 long hits a post-season game. Robertson hit two more home runs in the World Series; one of those came in Game Three off Baltimore starter Mike Cuellar with Clemente on second and Stargell on first. Third-base coach Frank Oceak had given Robertson the bunt sign in this at-bat, but Robertson, who had no sacrifice bunts on the season and only one the year before, missed it. Television replays showed that Clemente had appeared to call time-out just before that pitch; however, Cuellar was already in his windup at the time. Steve Blass, the winning pitcher in that Game Three, was sitting next to manager Danny Murtaugh in the Pirate dugout. The pitcher offered to pay the fine if Murtaugh imposed one on Robertson for missing the bunt sign. Murtaugh did not.

In the years following the World Series title, however, Robertson slumped, hitting only .193 with 12 home runs and 41 runs batted during , .239 with 14 home runs and 40 runs batted in during  and .229 with 16 home runs and 48 runs batted in during . After having surgery performed on both knees in 1974 he was reduced to a part-time role, averaging about 150 plate appearances in both 1975 and 1976. He hit .274 in 1975, but after compiling a .217 average in 1976, Robertson was released by Pittsburgh after the end of the 1976 season.

Robertson did not play baseball at any level during 1977. The Seattle Mariners picked him up as a free agent for the 1978 season, for whom he hit .230 as a part-time first-baseman/designated hitter in 64 games. Released again, he was signed by the Toronto Blue Jays a few weeks into the 1979 season as a backup for first baseman John Mayberry. His only home home run (and only one run batted in) as a Blue Jay, hit on April 29, was the go-ahead run in a 5-3 victory against the Milwaukee Brewers. However, Robertson was used very infrequently by the Jays, appearing in only 15 games and posting a .103 average in 29 at bats. He was released on June 27, bringing his professional playing career to a close.

Career highlights
In an eleven-year major league career, Robertson played in 829 games, accumulating 578 hits in 2,385 at bats for a .242 career batting average along with 115 home runs, 368 runs batted in and a .331 on-base percentage. Defensively, he posted a career .994 fielding percentage as a first baseman and a .993 fielding percentage overall. Known for his impressive power hitting, he hit the first home run ever hit into the left-field upper deck of Three Rivers Stadium—one of only 13 upper-deck home runs in the stadium's history. His shot came off San Diego Padre pitcher Steve Arlin on July 16, 1971. Pirate announcer Bob Prince called Robertson "The Mount Savage Strongboy" and once said of him, "Robertson could hit a ball out of any park—including Yellowstone."

Personal life
Robertson was born in Frostburg, Maryland on October 2, 1946, and raised in Mount Savage, Maryland where he graduated from Mount Savage High School. Robertson lives in LaVale, Maryland with his wife, Carolyn. They have seven grandchildren.

References

External links

Bob Robertson - Baseballbiography.com

1946 births
Living people
Águilas Cibaeñas players
American expatriate baseball players in the Dominican Republic
Asheville Tourists players
American expatriate baseball players in Canada
Baseball players from Maryland
Columbus Jets players
Florida Instructional League Pirates players
Gastonia Pirates players
Major League Baseball first basemen
People from Frostburg, Maryland
People from Mount Savage, Maryland
Pittsburgh Pirates players
Salem Rebels players
Seattle Mariners players
Toronto Blue Jays players